François Émile Michel (19 July 1828 – 23 May 1909) was a French painter, art critic and art historian.

Born in Metz, Michel became a student of Auguste Migette and Laurent-Charles Maréchal, the stained glass painter, and began to exhibit in 1853. Among Michel's masterpieces are Une Gardense d'Oies (1853) and Unit d'ete (1872). He wrote for the Gazette des Beaux-Arts and other periodicals. His most famous book is on the life and works of Rembrandt. His other books include Les Brueghel and Paul Potter. He was elected a member of the Institut de France in 1892. He died in Paris.

Paintings
 Bords de la Couse à Saillan, musée de Soissons
 Dans la lande, Palais des Beaux-Arts de Lille
 Le Torrent de Cerveyrieux dans l'Ain, Musée Antoine Vivenel
 Semailles d'automne, musée du Louvre

Publications
 La Forêt de Fontainebleau dans la nature, dans l’histoire, dans la littérature et dans l’art, Renouard, Paris, 1909.
 Les Maîtres du paysage, Hachette, Paris, 1906.
 Essais sur l’histoire de l’art, Société d’édition artistique, Paris, 1900.
 Rubens, sa vie, son œuvre et son temps, Hachette, Paris, 1900.
 Rembrandt. Sa vie, son œuvre et son temps, Hachette, paris, 1893.
 Jacob van Ruysdael et les Paysagistes de l’École de Harlem, Librairie de l’art, Paris, 1892.
 Les Brueghel. Paris : Librairie de l’art, 1892
 Hobbéma et les Paysagistes de son temps en Hollande, Librairie de l’art, Paris, 1890.
 Le Musée de Cologne. Paris : J. Rouam, 1884.
 Étude historique et critique sur le musée de peinture de la ville de Metz, Blanc, Metz, 1868.

References

1828 births
1909 deaths
Writers from Metz
French art critics
19th-century French painters
French male painters
20th-century French painters
20th-century male artists
French male writers
Metz School
Rembrandt scholars